Svavar Pétur Eysteinsson  (26 April 1977 – 29 September 2022), better known by his stage name Prins Póló, was an Icelandic singer-songwriter and experimental artist. He was also part of the Icelandic band Skakkamanage.

Skakkamanage

Svavar Pétur Eysteinsson started his career in the mid 2000s when he developed the alternative rock band Skakkamanage that released three albums: Lab of Love in 2006, followed by All Over The Face in 2008. The latter album was nominated for "Best Album" in Iceland Kraumur Awards.

The band made a comeback in 2014 with the album Sounds of Merrymaking with "Free From Love" released as a single from the latter album.

Skakkamanage is made up of: 
Svavar Pétur Eysteinsson - vocals
Berglind Häsler - keyboards
Þormóður Dagsson - drums
Örn Ingi Ágústsson - bass

Solo career
Being front man of the band, Svavar Pétur Eysteinsson also developed a solo career taking  Prins Póló as an alter-ego for himself.

Prins Póló sings about social issues with often quirky lyrics, catchy tunes and theatrics wearing various masks and head sets and trademark paper crowns designed for him and charismatic live performances. At times, performances are done with various Icelandic music formations like FM Belfast, Reykjavík! and Sudden Weather Change. He released his EP Einn heima in 2009 followed by two studio albums Jukk (2010) and Sorrí (2014). In 2019, he released the albums Túrbó and Falskar minningar.

Illness and death
Pétur was diagnosed with stage 4 cancer in 2018. He died in September 2022, at the age of 45.

Discography: Skakkamanage

Albums
2006: Lab of Love
2008: All Over the Face
2014: Sounds of Merrymaking

Singles
2014: Free from Love

Discography: Solo
(credited as Prinspóló (until 2012) and Prins Póló 2013 and later)

Albums
2010: Jukk 
2014: Sorrí
2014: París Norðursins
2018: Þriðja Kryddið
2019: Túrbó
2019: Falskar minningar

EPs
2009: Einn heima EP

Singles
2011: "Niðrá strönd"
2012: "Tipp Topp" 
2012: "Lúxuslíf"
2012: "Föstudagsmessa"
2012: "Landspítalinn" 
2013: "Bragðarefir" 
2014: "Fallegi smiðurinn"
2014: "París Norðursins"
2014: "Kalt á toppnum" (with Baggalútur) 
2016: "Sandalar"
2016: "Læda Slæda"
2016: "Hamster Charm"
2016: "Dúllur"

References

External Links

External links
Official website

1977 births
2022 deaths
21st-century Icelandic male singers
Icelandic rock singers